Powder Horn is a skills resource course for Venturing and Boy Scouting leaders and youth (age 14 and up) of the Boy Scouts of America (BSA).  Powder Horn is also described as a "hands-on resource management course" designed to give Scouting leaders "the contacts and tools necessary to conduct an awesome high-adventure program" in their Scouting unit.  The goals of Powder Horn are to help Scout leaders safely conduct outdoor activities of a fun and challenging nature, provide an introduction to the resources necessary to successfully lead youth through a program of high adventure, and familiarize participants with the skills involved in different high adventure disciplines.  The Powder Horn course will also introduce Venturing leaders to the Ranger youth award program, so adults may better help Venturers in meeting the Ranger award requirements.  Powder Horn presents a wide variety of hands-on high adventure skills experiences, and thus is not designed to provide specific skills certifications.  The course is meant to be held over a one-week period or two three-day weekends. Youth attendees will get first-hand experience and information as well as resources so they can better act as Event Chairs for their units.

Website
There is not currently an official Powder Horn website.  Since at least 2003, an unofficial website has been maintained by Powder Horn volunteers.  Interested Scouters should contact their local council service center for official information about upcoming Powder Horn courses, and an unofficial list of many current courses can be found at:

http://www.powderhorn-bsa.org/dates.html

Logo

The official Powder Horn course logo is an old-fashioned pioneer's powder horn suspended from the BSA universal emblem.

State-specific logos
Some states may choose to create a custom Powder Horn logo, such as a Texas star suspending a powder horn.

Origins

The Powder Horn course was initially created in the state of Texas in 1998, and subsequently presented at the Philmont Scout Ranch in the fall of 1999.  The course was then rolled out to be run at region and area levels, and can now be offered by local councils.  There is now a Powder Horn Course Director Conference, usually held in each region at least once a year.  Attendance at such a course is no longer mandatory for those who wish to conduct a Powder Horn course as a course director.

Culture
The Powder Horn staff specifically promote a custom-tailored Venturing-like Scouting leadership culture.

Crew method
Course participants are organized into numbered Crews, playing the role of Venturing youth.  Each Crew is assigned a Crew Guide, an operational course staff member playing the role of an older Venturing youth.  The Powder Horn course director is assigned to be the Venturing Advisor, and assistant course directors are assigned to be Associate Advisors, playing the roles of Venturing adult leaders.

Daily theme
Powder Horn course staff may choose to provide dress and activity themes on a day-by-day basis.  Staff members and participants are encouraged to wear clothing or costumes matching each day's theme, and additional theme-related activities or food may be available.  Possible themes include wild west cowboys, area 51 aliens, and pirates.

Fun
An emphasis is placed on providing a relatively relaxed atmosphere, focused on fun and enjoyment of the many hands-on experiences presented.

Gear

Like many other Scouting experiences, course participants have the opportunity to acquire multiple pieces of Powder Horn paraphernalia and documentation.

Certificate

Upon successful completion of the course, Powder Horn participants may be formally recognized with a certificate and medal.  The certificate is suitable for framing.

Medals
The original Powder Horn medal consisted of the Powder Horn logo suspended from a button catch and hung from the button on the left breast pocket of a Scouting field uniform shirt.

The new Powder Horn medal consists of a smaller Powder Horn logo mounted on a pin with a butterfly military clutch as backing.  The pin medal is worn on the left breast pocket flap in the same approximate location as the original hanging medal, near or above the pocket's button.  Scouters may optionally choose to wear their pin medal as a device or hat pin, per applicable Scouting uniform regulations.

Nameplate
Powder Horn participants may be provided a custom nameplate, suitable for wear on any Scouting uniform shirt.

Belt-buckle
Powder Horn participants may be given the opportunity to purchase a variety of custom Powder Horn belt-buckles, suitable for wear on any Scouting uniform belt.

Activity uniforms
Powder Horn participants may be provided one or more custom Scouting shirts, and additional shirts may be available for purchase.

Skills
Each Powder Horn course provides an introduction to a variety of high adventure skills, limited only by what is available in the region where the course is being held.

Possible high adventure skills include:

 All-Terrain Vehicles
 Aquatics Lifesaving
 Backpacking
 Camping
 Canoeing
 Caving
 Climbing / Rappelling
 Project COPE / Ropes Course
 Expedition Planning
 Extreme Sports
 Geocaching
 First Aid
 Fishing
 Historical Reenactment / Living History
 Horsemanship
 Hunting
 Kayaking
 Leave No Trace
 Motorboating
 Mountain Biking
 Orienteering
 Personal Watercraft
 Sailing
 Search & Rescue
 Scuba Diving
 Shooting Sports / Archery
 Snorkeling
 Space Exploration
 Whitewater Rafting
 Wilderness Survival
 Winter Sports & Camping
 Zip-Line

Gallery

Footnotes

Advancement and recognition in the Boy Scouts of America
Leadership training of the Boy Scouts of America
Scoutcraft
1998 establishments in the United States
Awards established in 1998